mop.com is the name of a Chinese bulletin board system (BBS). Though popular in China, it has been cited as a source of controversy. 

MOP (www.mop.com) is one of the most well known and influential simplified Chinese entertainment forums currently online.  The site was created in October 1997. There are 28.685 million individual users on MOP, ranking it the 2nd most popular website in the Chinese BBS network, following only Tianya.cn. The website has been called 猫扑大客栈(Mop Station)、猫扑大星球(Mop Planet), but then changed back to 猫扑 (Mop).

History 
Mop.com was created by Zhe Tian, who went by the moniker "Mop". He stepped down from his administrative positions in 2002 following a series of large updates that were carried out on the website. Since then, the website has had multiple changes to its administrative team.

Originally created for the discussion of console games such as those on the Xbox and PS3, the website soon expanded to cover PC games after receiving suggestions for it. Since then, they have grown and continue to grow through community feedback. Its development also saw the creation of numerous internet slang, such as YY (dreaming about things that won't happen), 233 (laughing out loud) and Orz (a figure depicting a bowing position), among others.

In 2005, Mop.com officially acquired IT news website DoNews.

Exposure of Internet Regulation Operation 
On January 5, 2009, Mop's section "Beautiful Ladies" was reported to the China Internet Illegal Information Reporting Centre. On January 8, 2009, Mop.com was listed by the Chinese government on "Websites needed to be further improved and rectified".

Sources

See also
Tianya Club

Bulletin board systems
Internet forums